The 1937 UCI Track Cycling World Championships were the World Championship for track cycling. They took place in Copenhagen, Denmark from 21 to 29 August 1937. Three events for men were contested, two for professionals and one for amateurs.

Medal summary

Medal table

See also
 1937 UCI Road World Championships

References

Track cycling
UCI Track Cycling World Championships by year
International cycle races hosted by Denmark
International sports competitions in Copenhagen
UCI World Championships
UCI Track Cycling World Championships
1930s in Copenhagen